Firebrand (Gary Gilbert) is a supervillain appearing in American comic books published by Marvel Comics. A superpowered enforcer for corrupt industrialist Justin Hammer, Firebrand is a former activist who turned to violence after believing peaceful protest produced no results.

Publication history
Firebrand first appeared in Iron Man #27 (July 1970), and was created by Archie Goodwin and Don Heck.

Fictional character biography

Gary Gilbert

Gary Gilbert was born in Detroit, Michigan. A superpowered enforcer for corrupt industrialist Justin Hammer, as Firebrand he is a former radical activist saboteur who turns to violence after believing peaceful protest produced no results. Firebrand's "clenched fist" logo on his chest recalls the Black Power movement.

In his first appearance in Iron Man #27 (July 1970), Firebrand describes his experiences demonstrating for the civil rights movement in a speech to Iron Man:

While the story includes some positive messages about the civil rights movement, Firebrand is presented as a villain, because he sets himself outside of the existing political structure, and is willing to let innocents die to further his political and social aims. In his article "Everyday Heroism in Superhero Narratives", Michael Goodrum writes, "Having pursued tactics of accommodation without result, he turns to confrontation, asserting that there is nothing of value left in the system if it treats peaceful reformers with violence — essentially laying bare the coercive nature of power. It is Firebrand's absolutism that marks him as a villain in terms of the narrative."

Firebrand accidentally killed his own father. He also won the Black Lama's "War of the Supervillains". He then fell to alcoholism and gave up political activism only to work for other villains because he "needed the work".  He later gave up his costumed identity and became a "supervillain agent", brokering employment for other costumed villains.

When news of the Scourge of the Underworld's initial wave of supervillain murders spread among the criminal community, Gilbert took it upon himself to gather several costumed criminals for a meeting to determine what should be done about this menace. The meeting, held at an abandoned tavern in Medina County, Ohio, known among the criminal underworld as "The Bar With No Name", turned out to be a massacre, as Scourge infiltrated the event disguised as a bartender; a few minutes into the meeting, Scourge slaughtered every criminal present, including Gilbert, with machine gun fire.

Firebrand was later among seventeen of the criminals murdered by the Scourge, who were resurrected by Hood using the power of Dormammu as part of a squad assembled to eliminate the Punisher. After the Punisher is captured, he is present at the ritual where the Hood intends to resurrect the Punisher's family. Microchip shoots G. W. Bridge in the head, which activates the ritual using Bridge's life force to resurrect Microchip and Punisher's families. The Punisher refuses to accept this, and forces Firebrand to burn his family alive, and then Punisher shoots Firebrand in the back of the head.

Powers, abilities, and equipment
Gary Gilbert wore a suit with an armored exoskeleton that gave him superhuman strength and resistance to fire. It also housed flamethrowers (which allowed him to fire thermal blasts from his hands), one mounted on each wrist, and flying jets that gave him the ability to fly.

Other Firebrands
After Gilbert's death, a man named Russ Broxtel was seen acting as the new fire-themed member of the eco-terrorist group known as the Force of Nature, and fought Spider-Man. With Force of Nature, he also battled Cloak and Dagger and the New Warriors. Firebrand was later hired by R.A.I.D and helped into London by Fasaud. The Arabian Knight confronted Firebrand who struck back with a wall of flame. Protected by his magic uniform, the Knight stopped Firebrand.

After Civil War, Firebrand returned to the United States. Donning a new suit, he attempted to rob a gas station. He was stopped by Young Avengers members Hawkeye and Patriot. Firebrand escaped and was later seen along with King Cobra, Mauler and Mister Hyde, who attacked Yellowjacket, Constrictor and other Initiative staff and trainees. 

Richard L. "Rick" Dennison was the third Firebrand. He was an anti-capitalist eco-terrorist who worked with a group called the Flaming Sword, and he fought Iron Man on several occasions. After he recovered, Firebrand returned with the Flaming Sword and kidnapped Osborn Chemical vice-president Charles Standish. He was then confronted by the Avengers and he was defeated. Firebrand later appeared as a member of the Shadow Council's incarnation of the Masters of Evil.

Baron Zemo later recruited Firebrand, Flying Tiger and Plantman II to join his "New Masters". They later encounter Steve Rogers, the original Captain America, Free Spirit and Jack Flag. During the fight, Firebrand is defeated by Free Spirit.

A female Firebrand was recruited by Mandarin and Zeke Stane in a plot to dispose of Iron Man. She is later hired along with Living Laser and Vibro by a Colombian drug lord to protect his bunker from Iron Man, who is after an Extremis virus sample; she ends up knocked unconscious by sleeping gas released from Iron Man's armor. During the Infinity storyline, Firebrand was among the villains enlisted by Spymaster to assault the nearly-defenseless Stark Tower. In this appearance, her first name is revealed to be Amanda.

In other media
 The Gary Gilbert incarnation of Firebrand appears in the Iron Man episode "Fire and Rain", voiced by Neal McDonough. This version is the son of late ex-Stark Industries employee Simon Gilbert, who had stolen money from Tony Stark and started a fire that killed himself, which Gary blamed Stark for. Calling himself Firebrand, Gary attacks power sources and demands a ransom of a million dollars. After Iron Man and War Machine confront him at a dam that Gary destroyed, Gary attempts to escape via jetpack, but it and Iron Man's armor malfunction. War Machine confronts his fear of water to save them. Once they divert the flood, Iron Man and War Machine hand Gary over to the police.
 Firebrand appears in the Iron Man: Armored Adventures episode "World on Fire" as a fire spirit and the guardian of a Makluan Ring created by the original Mandarin to test his potential successors' temperance. Anyone who fails the test becomes possessed by the Firebrand and turned into a lava monster until someone passes.

References

External links
 Firebrand I at Marvel Wiki
 
 

Characters created by Archie Goodwin (comics)
Characters created by Don Heck
Characters created by Kurt Busiek
Characters created by Matt Fraction
Comics characters introduced in 1970
Comics characters introduced in 1991
Comics characters introduced in 1998
Comics characters introduced in 2012
Fictional activists
Fictional characters from Detroit
Fictional characters with fire or heat abilities
Marvel Comics female supervillains
Marvel Comics male supervillains
Marvel Comics supervillains